The Mussau-Emira language is spoken on the islands of Mussau and Emirau in the St Matthias Islands in the Bismarck Archipelago.

Phonology

Phonemes

Consonants

Mussau-Emira distinguishes the following consonants.

 Fricative sounds  may also be heard as voiced stop sounds  in word-initial position and when geminated.

Vowels

Stress

In most words the primary stress falls on the penultimate vowel and secondary stresses fall on every second syllable preceding that. This is true of suffixed forms as well, as in níma 'hand', nimá-gi 'my hand'; níu 'coconut', niúna 'its coconut'.

Morphology

Pronouns and person markers

Free pronouns

Subject prefixes
Prefixes mark the subjects of each verb:
 (agi) a-namanama 'I'm eating'
 (io) u-namanama 'you're (sing.) eating'
 (ia) e-namanama 'he's/she's eating'

Sample vocabulary

Numbers

 kateva
 galua
 kotolu
 gaata
 galima
 gaonomo
 gaitu
 gaoalu
 kasio
 kasaŋaulu

References

Further reading 
 Blust, Robert (1984). "A Mussau vocabulary, with phonological notes." In Malcolm Ross, Jeff Siegel, Robert Blust, Michael A. Colburn, W. Seiler, Papers in New Guinea Linguistics, No. 23, 159-208. Series A-69. Canberra: Pacific Linguistics.  
 Ross, Malcolm (1988). Proto Oceanic and the Austronesian languages of western Melanesia. Canberra: Pacific Linguistics.  	
 Mussau Grammar Essentials by John and Marjo Brownie (Data Papers on Papua New Guinea Languages, volume 52). 2007. Ukarumpa: SIL.

External links 
 Kaipuleohone has archived a word list of Mussau language
 Materials on Mussau-Emira are included in the open access Arthur Capell (AC1) and Malcolm Ross (MR1) collections held by Paradisec.

St Matthias languages
Languages of New Ireland Province
Definitely endangered languages